The Swiney Prize, a British award made every five years by the Royal Society of Arts with the Royal College of Physicians, was set up by the will of George Swiney, an English physician who died in 1844.

The prize came to be awarded alternately for medical jurisprudence and general jurisprudence. New cups were designed, after an initial stable period when a pattern by Daniel Maclise was reused. The first new design came in 1919, by Melvin Oliver.

George Swiney (1793–1844)
George Swiney, a physician, was the son of William Swiney (1748–1829), Admiral of the Red. He was born on 8-Jun-1793 at St Marylebone, Middlesex, England. He was educated at Edinburgh University, where he graduated M.D. in 1816.  Having retired from practice, he settled in London, lived a secluded life, and acquired a reputation as an eccentric. He spent much time on his will and died at Grove Street, Camden Town, on 21 January 1844. He bequeathed £5,000 to the Society of Arts, to found a quinquennial prize for the best published essay on jurisprudence, the prize to be adjudicated jointly by the Society of Arts and the London College of Physicians

Lectureship in Geology

Swiney also left £5,000 to the British Museum to found a lectureship in geology, the lecturer to be an M.D. of Edinburgh. Holders have included
 William Benjamin Carpenter from 1847 to 1852 (First holder)
 Robert Edmond Grant from 1853
 Thomas Spencer Cobbold from 1868 to 1873
 Ramsay Traquair 1883 to 1887 and 1896 to 1900
 William Ramsey McNab from 1888 to his death in 1889
 Robert Francis Scharff from 1906 to 1908

List of winners
1849 John Samuel Martin Fonblanque and John Ayrton Paris, Medical   Jurisprudence, first award
1854 Leone Levi, Commercial Law of the World.
1859 Alfred Swaine Taylor, Medical Jurisprudence
1864 Henry James Sumner Maine, Ancient Law
1869, William Augustus Guy, Principles of Forensic Medicine
1874 Robert Joseph Phillimore, Commentaries on International Law
1879 Norman Chevers, Manual of Medical Jurisprudence for India
1884 Sheldon Amos
1889 Charles Meymott Tidy, Legal Medicine
1894 Thomas Erskine Holland, Elements of Jurisprudence
1899 John Dixon Mann
1905 Frederick Pollock and Frederic William Maitland, History of English Law before Edward the First
1909 Charles Arthur Mercier, Criminal Responsibility
1914 John William Salmond, Jurisprudence or the Theory of the Law 
1919 Charles Arthur Mercier, Crime and Criminals
1924 Paul Vinogradoff
1929 Sydney Alfred Smith, Forensic Medicine
1934 William Searle Holdsworth
1939 James Couper Brash and John Glaister, Medico-Legal Aspects of the Ruxton Case
1944 Carlton Kemp Allen, Law in the Making
1949 John Glaister, Medical Jurisprudence and Toxicology
1954 George Whitecross Paton, Textbook of Jurisprudence (2nd edition)
1959 Keith Simpson, Forensic Medicine (3rd edition)
1964 Julius Stone, The Province and Function of Law, and Glanville Williams Criminal Law: The General Part
1969 Francis Edward Camps, Gradwohl's Legal Medicine (2nd edition)
1974 Stroud Francis Charles Milsom
1979 John Kenyon Mason, Forensic Medicine for Lawyers and his edition of The Pathology of Violent Injury
1984 Patrick Atiyah, Promises, Morals and Law
1989 P. D. G. Skegg, Law, Ethics and Medicine: Studies in Medical Law
1994 John Kelly, A Short History of Western Legal Theory
2000 Ronald Dworkin
2004 Nicola Lacey, A Life of H.L.A. Hart: The Nightmare and the Noble Dream

Notes

Further reading
Eleanor Thompson, The Swiney Prize: 150 years of goldsmiths' work, Apollo: The international magazine of arts, ISSN 0003-6536, Nº. 395, 1995, pp. 30–37

Attribution

English literary awards
1849 establishments in England
Awards established in 1849
Royal Society of Arts
Royal College of Physicians